Betsy Haynes is an American author who has written seventy-nine novels in the genres of history, mysteries, supernatural, ghost stories and comedies.

She is married to Jim Haynes.  They have two children live in the Stewart Peninsula section of The Colony, Texas on Lake Lewisville north of Dallas.

Selected bibliography

The Great Mom Swap was made into a movie first airing in 1995.
Deadly Deception named American Library Assn., Quick Pick, the New York Public Library Books for the Teen Age and was put on the Texas Lone Star List.
Boy Talk
The Bone Chillers series
The Fabulous Five series

References

External links
Betsy Haynes website

20th-century American novelists
American mystery writers
American women novelists
Living people
Novelists from Texas
American horror writers
Women horror writers
Women mystery writers
20th-century American women writers
People from The Colony, Texas
Year of birth missing (living people)
21st-century American women